These are the official results of the Women's High Jump event at the 1983 IAAF World Championships in Helsinki, Finland. There were a total number of 33 participating athletes, with two qualifying groups and the final held on Tuesday August 9, 1983.

Medalists

Schedule
All times are Eastern European Time (UTC+2)

Records

Results

Qualifying round
Held on Qualification Sunday 1983-08-07

Final

See also
 National champions high jump (women)
 1980 Women's Olympic High Jump (Moscow)
 1982 Women's European Championships High Jump (Athens)
 1984 Women's Olympic High Jump (Los Angeles)
 1984 Women's Friendship Games High Jump (Prague)
 1986 Women's European Championships High Jump (Stuttgart)

References

 Results
 IAAF Results

H
High jump at the World Athletics Championships
1983 in women's athletics